Aloys Schmitt (26 August 1788 – 25 July 1866) was a German composer, pianist and music teacher. He was born in Erlenbach am Main. He studied composition with Johann Anton André in Offenbach. In 1824 he was appointed court composer in Munich.  He received an honorary doctorate from the University of Giessen.

Among his students were Ferdinand Hiller, Carl Almenräder, Carl Arnold and Carl Wolfsohn. 

His Preparatory Exercises (op. 16) remain important technical studies along with the Hanon exercises.

References

External links 
 
 

German Romantic composers
German classical pianists
Male classical pianists
German music educators
1788 births
1866 deaths
19th-century classical composers
German male classical composers
19th-century classical pianists
19th-century German composers
German pianists
German male pianists
19th-century German male musicians